Sazlıköy railway station is a railway station in Sazlı, Turkey, just north of Söke. The station is located in the northern part of the town, adjacent to the D.525 state highway. TCDD Taşımacılık operates regional rail service from Söke to İzmir, Denizli and Nazilli, totalling five trains per day, in each direction. Sazlıköy station opened on 1 December 1890 by the Ottoman Railway Company along with the branch line to Söke.

References

External links
TCDD Taşımacılık

Railway stations in Aydın Province
Railway stations opened in 1890
1890 establishments in the Ottoman Empire